The B-52's is an American new wave band formed in Athens, Georgia, in 1976. The original lineup consisted of Fred Schneider (vocals, percussion), Kate Pierson (vocals, keyboards, synth bass), Cindy Wilson (vocals, percussion), Ricky Wilson (guitar), and Keith Strickland (drums, guitar, keyboards). Ricky Wilson died of AIDS-related illness in 1985, and Strickland switched from drums to lead guitar. The band also added various members for albums and live performances.

The group evoked a "thrift shop aesthetic", in Bernard Gendron's words, by drawing from 1950s and 1960s pop sources, trash culture, and rock and roll. Schneider, Pierson, and Wilson sometimes use call-and-response-style vocals (Schneider's often humorous sprechgesang contrasting with Wilson's and Pierson's melodic harmonies), and their guitar- and keyboard-driven instrumentation is their trademark sound, which was also set apart from their contemporaries by the unusual guitar tunings Ricky Wilson used on their earlier albums. The band has had many hits, including "Rock Lobster", "Planet Claire", "Party Out of Bounds", "Private Idaho", "Whammy Kiss", "Summer of Love", "Wig", "Love Shack", "Roam" and "(Meet) The Flintstones". They have been nominated for Grammy awards three times: in 1989, 1990 for 'Best Pop Performance By A Duo Or Group With Vocal' and in 1992 for 'Best Alternative Music Album'.

In April 2022, the group announced they were retiring from touring. A 2023 Las Vegas residency was announced in November of 2022.

History

1976–1979: Formation and early years
The B-52's formed in 1976 when Cindy Wilson, Ricky Wilson (her elder brother), Pierson, Strickland, and cowbell player, poet, and lead vocalist Schneider held an impromptu jam session after sharing a flaming volcano drink at a Chinese restaurant in Athens, Georgia. When they first jammed, Strickland played guitar and Ricky Wilson played congas. They later played their first concert (with Wilson on guitar) in 1977 at a Valentine's Day party for their friends.

The name B-52's comes from a particular beehive hairdo resembling the nose cone of the aircraft, which Pierson and Cindy Wilson wore in performances during the band's first decade. Other names the band considered were the Tina-Trons and Fellini's Children. Strickland suggested the name after a dream he had of a band performing in a hotel lounge. In the dream, he heard someone whisper in his ear that the band's name was the B-52's.

The band's quirky take on the new wave sound of its era was a combination of dance and surf music set apart from their contemporaries by the unusual guitar tunings Ricky Wilson used and thrift-store chic.

The band's first single, "Rock Lobster", recorded for DB Records in 1978, was an underground success, selling over 2,000 copies, that led to gigs at CBGB and Max's Kansas City. Both this version of "Rock Lobster" and its B-side, "52 Girls", are different recordings from those that appear on the band's 1979 debut album, and the early version of "52 Girls" is in a different key.

The rerecorded version of "Rock Lobster" was also released as a single and in the UK and Germany was backed with an instrumental version of "Running Around", a non-album track at the time. (A vocal rerecording of this appears on the band's second album, 1980's Wild Planet.) The buzz the record created in the UK meant their first show in London at the Electric Ballroom was packed and attended by UK pop stars, including Sandie Shaw, Green Gartside from Scritti Politti, and Joe Jackson. In Canada, released on the Warner Bros. label, the single went from cult hit to No. 1 on the RPM-compiled national chart on May 24, 1980.

1979–1982: The B-52's, Wild Planet, and Mesopotamia
In 1979, The B-52's signed contracts as they flew over to Compass Point Studios in Nassau, Bahamas, to record their debut studio album, with Island founder Chris Blackwell producing. The band was surprised by Blackwell's recording methods; he wanted to keep the sound as close as possible to its live sound, so he used almost no overdubs or additional effects.

Released on July 6, 1979, The B-52's contained rerecorded versions of "Rock Lobster" and "52 Girls", six originals recorded solely for the album, and a cover of the Petula Clark hit "Downtown". The album was a major success, especially in Australia, where it reached No. 3 on the charts alongside its three singles: "Planet Claire", "Rock Lobster", and "Dance This Mess Around". In the U.S., the single "Rock Lobster" reached the Billboard Hot 100 chart, while the album was certified platinum by the RIAA. In 1980, John Lennon called the B-52's his favorite band and specifically cited "Rock Lobster" as an inspiration for his Double Fantasy.

In April 1980, The B-52's returned to Compass Point Studios to record their next album. Several of the songs on the new album had been concert staples since 1978; the band consciously did not record them for its first album since it already had too many tracks and wanted a strong second album, knowing that its live performances would make fans look forward to it. Rhett Davies co-produced the album, which had a more polished production sound than the debut.

Released on August 27, 1980, Wild Planet was well received by critics; many fans consider it the band's best album. It reached No. 18 on the Billboard 200 chart in 1980 and was certified gold; "Private Idaho" became the band's second Hot 100 entry. The B-52's performed on Saturday Night Live on January 26, 1980, and at the Heatwave festival (promoted as the "New Wave Woodstock") in Toronto, Canada, in August 1980. The band also appeared in the Paul Simon film One Trick Pony. In July 1981, Party Mix! was released, a six-song collection containing songs from the first two albums remixed and sequenced to form two long tracks, one on each side.

In 1981, the band collaborated with Talking Heads' David Byrne to produce a third full-length studio album. Reportedly due to differences with Byrne over the album's musical direction, recording sessions for the album were aborted, prompting the band to release Mesopotamia in 1982 as an EP. (In 1991, Party Mix! and Mesopotamia, the latter of which had been remixed, were combined and released together on a single compact disc.) Also in 1982, the band appeared at the inaugural US Festival, performing on the first day.

1982–1987: Whammy!, Bouncing off the Satellites, and death of Ricky Wilson
In December 1982, the band began recording their third album, Whammy!. According to Pierson, Strickland no longer wanted to play the drums, so the band switched to drum machines for this album, with Strickland and Ricky Wilson playing all the music on the album, and the rest of the band providing vocals only. Having originally played guitars, organ, bass guitar and synthesizers, Pierson switched to a mainly vocal role in the studio, but remained behind the keyboards on tour. The band also began experimenting heavily with synthesizers during this period.

Released on April 27, 1983, Whammy! reached No. 29 on the Billboard 200 chart. "Legal Tender" reached the Billboard Hot 100 chart, as well as the Billboard Hot Dance Club Play Singles chart alongside "Whammy Kiss" and "Song for a Future Generation". For the Whammy! tour, some tracks featured Strickland on the drums while others used a backing track so Strickland could come forward and play other parts. This also freed up the vocalists (now sometimes not playing instruments) to perform some simple choreography. Copyright issues with Yoko Ono led to the cover song "Don't Worry" being removed from the album and replaced by "Moon 83"—a rearranged version of "There's a Moon in the Sky (Called the Moon)" from their debut album—on future pressings of Whammy!.

Before the work on the next album the band took a one-year break during which Fred Schneider released his debut solo album Fred Schneider and the Shake Society.

In January 1985, the B-52's performed in Brazil at Rock in Rio, for their largest crowd ever. Later during the year, the band struggled to write new material for their next album. The band members all lived together in the same house and felt that collaboration was not working, so they decided to try to write songs separately and began recording in July 1985, again using drum machines and synthesizers extensively. During the recording, guitarist Wilson had been suffering from AIDS, though none of the other band members were aware of his illness and homosexuality except for Strickland, as Wilson "did not want anyone to worry about him or fuss about him." Wilson died from his illness on October 12, 1985, at the age of 32.

When the band returned to the studio, Strickland had learned how to play the guitar in Wilson's unique style and switched permanently to the new instrument, leaving session players to complete the rhythm section. The results were released on September 8, 1986, as Bouncing off the Satellites, a mixture of solo efforts and group efforts. Because of Wilson's death, the band did not tour to promote the album. A music video was made for "Girl from Ipanema Goes to Greenland" and the band appeared on some UK television programs but then took a two-year hiatus.

Cindy Wilson was devastated by her brother's death, as were her bandmates. The band went into seclusion and did not tour to promote their album, marking the beginning of an extended hiatus from their musical careers. Keith Strickland moved to Woodstock, New York, while Pierson and Schneider stayed in New York City. In 1987, the band released a public service announcement in the style of the Beatles' Sgt. Pepper's Lonely Hearts Club Band album cover on behalf of amfAR, The Foundation for AIDS Research.

1988–1992: Comeback, Cosmic Thing, and Good Stuff
Strickland had been composing in 1988. After he played some of his new music for the other band members, they all agreed to try writing together again, with Pierson, Wilson and Schneider contributing the lyrics and melodies. In 1989, the band released Cosmic Thing, their mainstream breakthrough, on Reprise Records worldwide. The single "Channel Z" from the new album became an alternative and college radio hit, hitting No. 1 on the U.S. Hot Modern Rock Tracks chart, receiving significant airplay on MTV's modern rock show 120 Minutes. They then embarked on the Cosmic Tour.

The next single, "Love Shack", with its party vibe and colorful music video, became their first top 40 hit on the Billboard Hot 100, ultimately reaching No. 3 in November 1989. That peak was matched in March 1990 when their follow-up single, "Roam", also reached No. 3. In Australia, the country that had most embraced the band a decade earlier, "Love Shack" remained at No. 1 for eight weeks.

A fourth single, "Deadbeat Club", which reminisced about the band's early days in Athens and whose video was shot on location and featured a cameo by fellow Athens artist R.E.M.'s Michael Stipe, reached No. 30. Cosmic Thing climbed into the U.S. top five and earned multi-platinum certification. The album also had huge international success, reaching No. 1 in both Australia and New Zealand and No. 8 in the UK. The group had a hugely successful world tour to support the record and appeared on the cover of Rolling Stone in March 1990. In 1990, the B-52's were nominated for four MTV Video Music Awards, including Video of the Year. They won two awards: Best Group Video and Best Art Direction.

Pierson sang on Iggy Pop's song "Candy", which gave him a top 40 hit. In 1991, Schneider's 1984 solo record, Fred Schneider and the Shake Society, was repackaged and re-released, resulting in his first Hot 100 single when "Monster" climbed to No. 85. Also that year, Pierson again guest-starred on a popular track, R.E.M.'s "Shiny Happy People", which reached No. 10 in September. Pierson also appeared on two other songs from R.E.M.'s chart-topping album Out of Time: "Near Wild Heaven" and "Me in Honey", as well as the outtake "Fretless".

In late 1990, Cindy Wilson took time off from the band, with Julee Cruise filling in for her on tour. The B-52's released Good Stuff in 1992 as a trio—the only album release on which Cindy Wilson was not present—and the title track reached No. 28 in August of that year. The album made it to No. 16 in the U.S. It is also the group's most overtly political album, though they had been activists and fundraisers for environmental, AIDS and animal rights causes for many years.

1993–2007: Soundtrack appearances, 25th anniversary and touring
The band had their next chart entry in 1994 when, as The BC-52's, they appeared in The Flintstones live-action movie and sang the title song. When released as a single, it reached No. 33 in the U.S. and No. 3 in the UK. In 1994, Pierson and Schneider also sang on the theme song for the Nickelodeon series Rocko's Modern Life, from the second season onward. In the 1990s, former Duran Duran drummer Sterling Campbell joined the band, but left in 2000 to tour with David Bowie and was replaced that year by Zack Alford, who had recorded and toured with the band during the Cosmic Thing era. Pierson and Cindy Wilson recorded a cover of the McFadden & Whitehead song "Ain't No Stoppin' Us Now" for the 1996 film The Associate, starring Whoopi Goldberg; Wilson rejoined the B-52's the same year.

A career retrospective, Time Capsule: Songs for a Future Generation, appeared in 1998, along with two remixed maxi-singles: "Summer of Love '98" and "Hallucinating Pluto". A major tour (with co-headliners the Pretenders) to promote the collection took place. "Debbie", another single from the album (a tribute to Blondie's Debbie Harry), placed No. 35 on Billboard's Hot Modern Rock Tracks. In 1999, they recorded a parody of "Love Shack" called "Glove Slap" for an episode of The Simpsons. In 2000, they co-headlined another major tour with the Go-Go's and recorded the song "The Chosen One" for the movie Pokémon: The Movie 2000.

In 2002, a more extensive anthology, Nude on the Moon: The B-52's Anthology, was released, and in February of that year the band held a series of concerts celebrating their 25th anniversary. The Irving Plaza show in New York City featured Yoko Ono, as well as Tina Weymouth and Chris Frantz of Talking Heads, as guests, with Chicks on Speed as the opener. Coinciding with the band's 25th anniversary was the publication of The B-52's Universe: The Essential Guide to the World's Greatest Party Band, the first and only officially authorized biography of the band. The book was nominated for a Lambda Lit Award and was a Minnesota Book Awards finalist. The B-52's recorded the song "Orange You Glad It's Summer" for a Target commercial that aired in spring/summer 2002. Target also used the Cosmic Thing song "Junebug" in a TV spot five years later.

In late 2004, the band opened for Cher on a few dates of her Farewell Tour. In March 2006, they opened for The Rolling Stones at a benefit for the Robin Hood Foundation. They had three remix EPs released by Planet Clique: Whammy! in 2005, Mesopotamia in 2006, and Wild Planet in 2007. During this time span, they appeared on many television shows, including The L Word, V.I.P., The Rosie O'Donnell Show, The Tonight Show with Jay Leno, the Late Show with David Letterman, The Arsenio Hall Show, Saturday Night Live, Live with Regis and Kelly, The Today Show, Good Morning America, as well as numerous times on VH1.

2008–present: Funplex and continued touring
In 2008, the band dropped the apostrophe from their name to become "The B-52s". Funplex, the band's first original album in 16 years (since 1992's Good Stuff), was released on March 25, 2008, by Astralwerks. Talking about the record's sound, Strickland noted, "It's loud, sexy rock and roll with the beat turned up to hot pink." The album was produced by Steve Osborne, who was asked to work on the album based on his work with New Order on the album Get Ready.

The album debuted at No. 11 on the Billboard charts in the U.S., immediately making it the second-highest charting B-52s album ever. The band toured in support of the album and made appearances on talk shows, including The Tonight Show and The Ellen DeGeneres Show, and performed on The Today Show on Memorial Day 2008. They also participated in the True Colors Tour 2008 with Cyndi Lauper and embarked on a European tour in July.

The first single from the album was "Funplex", which was released digitally on January 29 to the iTunes Store in the U.S. The second single lifted from the album was "Juliet of the Spirits". Schneider said in an interview that the album just broke even and could be the B-52s' last new studio album, though he later retracted that statement. The B-52s performed their hit track "Love Shack" with Sugarland at the 2009 CMT Music Awards.

On February 18, 2011, the B-52s played a show at the Classic Center in their hometown of Athens, Georgia, four days after the 34th anniversary of their first-ever show on February 14, 1977. The concert was filmed and recorded for With the Wild Crowd! Live in Athens, GA, released in October 2011.

The group continued to perform live, with a touring band that featured musicians Sterling Campbell (drums), Paul Gordon (keyboards, guitar) and Tracy Wormworth (bass), and performances included the closing show for the 2011 edition of the Montreal Jazz Festival, as well as being the house band during the 2012 TV Land Awards. At the end of 2012, Strickland announced he would no longer tour with the B-52s, though he would continue as a member of the band. Without Strickland, the B-52s continued to tour across the world with groups including The Go-Go's, Tears for Fears, The English Beat, The Psychedelic Furs, Simple Minds, Boy George and Culture Club, and Thompson Twins' Tom Bailey. Aside from touring, the group covered the Squidbillies theme song during Season 10 of the Adult Swim series and appeared as guests in the sketch comedy show Portlandia.

In 2019, the group announced a tour to begin in May in the United States, which would take them to Europe and back to the U.S. through the fall. On September 30, 2019, it was reported that the band would be featured in the upcoming Archie Comics' comic book Archie Meets the B-52s, released in February 2020.

In April 2022, the group announced that they would embark on a final farewell tour, with KC and the Sunshine Band, lasting from August 11th to November 11th, 2022. The final dates of the concert were postponed until January 2023, due to illness.

Band members

Current members
Fred Schneider – vocals, percussion 
Kate Pierson – vocals, percussion , keyboards 
Cindy Wilson – vocals, percussion 
Keith Strickland – guitar, keyboards, programming, backing vocals , drums 
Tracy Wormworth – bass 
Sterling Campbell – drums 
Greg Suran – guitar 
Ken Maiuri – keyboards, guitar 

Former members
Ricky Wilson – guitar 
Pat Irwin – keyboards, guitar 
Zack Alford – drums 
Sara Lee – bass 
Julee Cruise – vocals 
Paul Gordon – keyboards, guitar 

Timeline

Discography

Studio albums
 The B-52's (1979)
 Wild Planet (1980)
 Whammy! (1983)
 Bouncing Off the Satellites (1986)
 Cosmic Thing (1989)
 Good Stuff (1992)
 Funplex (2008)

See also
Music of Athens, Georgia

References

Further reading
 
 Grow, Kory. "Love Shacks, Rock Lobsters and Nude Parties: The B-52's in Their Own Words," Rolling Stone, June 2, 2018.
 
Sexton, Mats (2002). The B-52's Universe: The Essential Guide to the World's Greatest Party Band. Plan-B Books. p. 232.

External links

 

 
 
 

 
1976 establishments in Georgia (U.S. state)
Musical groups from Athens, Georgia
Astralwerks artists
Island Records artists
LGBT-themed musical groups
Musical groups established in 1976
Rock music groups from Georgia (U.S. state)
Warner Records artists
Reprise Records artists
American new wave musical groups
American post-punk music groups
American art rock groups
Dance-rock musical groups
Art pop groups
Musical quartets
Sonet Records artists